Will Simmons (June 4, 1884 – January 1, 1949) was an American painter. His work was part of the painting event in the art competition at the 1936 Summer Olympics. His father was the painter and muralist Edward Emerson Simmons, one of the famous group called Ten American Painters.

References

1884 births
1949 deaths
20th-century American painters
American male painters
Olympic competitors in art competitions
People from Elche
20th-century American male artists